Rudolf Ekström (14 April 1895 – 16 January 1971) was a Finnish weightlifter. He competed in the men's light heavyweight event at the 1920 Summer Olympics.

References

External links
 

1895 births
1971 deaths
Finnish male weightlifters
Olympic weightlifters of Finland
Weightlifters at the 1920 Summer Olympics
Sportspeople from Helsinki